Furie may refer to:
 Furie (film), a 2019 action martial arts film
 HMS Wilhelmina (1798), previously Dutch frigate Furie
 Sidney J. Furie (born 1933), Canadian film director
 John Furie (born 1948), English footballer

See also
 Furey, a surname
 Furies (disambiguation)
 Fury (disambiguation)